Anthoni Salim, also known as Liem Hong Sien (born 25 October 1949), is an Indonesian businessman and investor. He is the head of the conglomerate Salim Group and the chairman of First Pacific, a Hong Kong-based investment management firm.

Early life 
Salim was born in Kudus, Central Java (a town nearby the main provincial capital city of Semarang) to entrepreneur Sudono Salim (1916-2012) and Lie Las Nio (1921-2015). His father was an emigrant turned naturalized Indonesian citizen who settled in Kudus before emigrating to Jakarta. His mother was a local-born full-blooded Chinese.

His father founded of the Salim Group, which Anthoni acceded after his father's death. He completed his education in 1971 at Ewell County Technical College (now North East Surrey College of Technology) in the United Kingdom. Despite not excelling in his studies, his return to Indonesia led him to become a successful businessman and investor.

During the May 1998 riots, his family's home was set on fire and he fled to Singapore.

After the riots subsided, he returned to Jakarta to rebuild his conglomerate and to pay off some $5 billion in remaining debt.

Career 
In 1998, during the Indonesian monetary crisis, Salim's father handed the company to Anthoni while the company had high debts. Now, he controls many of Salim Group's subsidiaries such as Indofood and Indomaret. He is the Chairman of First Pacific since 2003, after serving as a director since 1981.

He is listed as substantial shareholder (74%) of Indofood Agri Resources, a Singaporean agriculture holding company often criticized for working with dubious shadow companies involved in obtaining palm oil from undisclosed, contested land.

Forbes listed his net worth at $8.5 Billion as of December 2021.

Family 
At the age of 25, Salim married Siti Margareth Jusuf. They have three children.

His oldest son, Axton (born 1979), studied business administration in Colorado and has leading roles in Salim Group's companies. He is a director of Indofood since 2009, and non-executive director of IndoAgri since 2007. His youngest son, Alston, has become a fashion designer and cosplayer.

References

1949 births
Living people
Indonesian investors
Indonesian money managers
Indonesian people of Chinese descent
People from Kudus Regency